Joseph Polowsky (1916–1983) was an American soldier who with others met Soviet troops on the banks of Elbe River on April 25, 1945, and later became an anti-war activist.

He was the youngest son of Jewish immigrants who had immigrated from the Kiev area in the Russian Empire to the United States and worked first as a conductor and bus driver for the Chicago Transit Authority, then as a taxi driver for the Checker Cab Company in Chicago.

During World War II he was conscripted and served in the 69th Infantry Division. He belonged to a scouting party which crossed the Elbe in Torgau on April 25, 1945, and met Soviet troops on the other bank. Polowsky, who knew the Russian language, served to translate between the two groups. When the Americans and the Soviets saw bodies of German civilians killed by stray artillery fire near the river, the soldiers of both armies swore to do everything to prevent a new war.

In 1946 Polowsky was discharged from the army. Back in the U.S., he unsuccessfully asked the United Nations to declare 25 April a World Day of Peace.

Each year he commemorated the Elbe Day on the Michigan Avenue Bridge in Chicago and held a vigil. He continued to work as a taxi driver.

In 1959 he met Soviet Prime Minister Nikita Khrushchev who visited the United States. A short time later he was invited to visit the Soviet Union where he again met Khrushchev in the Kremlin. Then he visited East Germany and met Walter Ulbricht.

Already ill with cancer, Polowsky held his last vigil on Michigan Avenue Bridge on April 25, 1983. He died in Chicago on October 17, 1983. In his will he asked to be buried in Torgau, and was buried there with military honors on November 26, 1983.

In 1995 a high school in Torgau was named after him. He was memorialized in the Fred Small song "At The Elbe". A new rose variety was dedicated to Joe Polowsky in Torgau in 2006.

See also
 List of peace activists

References

External links
Joseph Polowski
DELAWARE STATE SENATE 140th GENERAL ASSEMBLY SENATE CONCURRENT RESOLUTION  NO. 35
The Milwaukee Journal - Apr 24, 1965
At The Elbe Lyrics by Fred Small

1916 births
1983 deaths
American anti-war activists
United States Army personnel of World War II
United States Army soldiers
American taxi drivers
Bus drivers